Rock Hill High School (RHHS) is the first of the three high schools in Rock Hill, South Carolina. A part of Rock Hill Schools, it offers the International Baccalaureate diploma to its senior class students, as well as dual credit and Advanced Placement. As of February 2016, RHHS has approximately 2,000 students in grades 9–12.

Athletics 

Rock Hill High offers a number of sports, including baseball, women's and men's basketball, cheerleading, cross country, football, golf, women's and men's soccer, softball, swimming, women's and men's tennis, track and field, wrestling, and volleyball. Its sports teams are known as the Bearcats and compete in Region 3-AAAAA of the South Carolina High School League (SCHSL).  

The athletic teams have achieved considerable success. The Bearcats wrestling team is recognized as a traditional South Carolina powerhouse, having won 19 team state championships. Rock Hill High SCHSL team accomplishments are listed below.

Football 
 AA Champions: 1945, 1946, 1953
 AAAA Division 1 Champions: 2002, 2004

Baseball 
 AAA Baseball Champions: 1967

Basketball 
 AAAA (Boy's) Champions: 2006
 AAAAA (Girl's) Champions: 2022

Cross Country 
 AAAA (Boy's) Champions: 1990

Tennis 
 AAAA (Boy's) Champions: 1971
 AAAAA (Girl's) State Champions: 2017

Wrestling 
 AAAAA Champions: 2018
 AAAA Champions: 1980, 1982, 1983, 1984, 1985, 1986, 1989, 1990, 1991, 1994, 1995, 1996, 1997, 1999, 2000, 2009, 2014, 2015
 AAAA Runners-up: 1978, 1979, 1981, 1987, 1988, 1992, 1993, 1998, 2004, 2005, 2008, 2010, 2013, 2016

Golf 
 AAAAA (Boy's) Champions: 2018

Notable alumni 
 Phillip Adams, NFL cornerback
 Gerald Dixon, NFL linebacker
 Tori Gurley, NFL and CFL wide receiver
 Jonathan Hefney, NFL and CFL defensive back, two-time CFL All-Star selection
 Jim Hoagland, two-time Pulitzer Prize winning journalist
 Chris Hope, NFL safety, 2008 Pro Bowl selection and Super Bowl XL champion with the Pittsburgh Steelers
 Jonathan Meeks, NFL safety
 Ralph Norman, real estate developer and politician
 Tommy Pope, solicitor and politician
 Keith Richardson, professional tennis player
 Leon Rippy, actor
 Bob Bolin, MLB pitcher
 Jaleel Scott, NFL wide receiver
 Ko Simpson, NFL safety
 Arkee Whitlock, NFL and CFL running back

References

External links 
 Official school website

Buildings and structures in Rock Hill, South Carolina
Public high schools in South Carolina
Schools in York County, South Carolina
International Baccalaureate schools in South Carolina